is a railway station in the city of Oga, Akita Prefecture,  Japan, operated by East Japan Railway Company (JR East).

Lines

Station layout
The staffed station has a single island platform, with the station building at the tail end (south) of the platform.

Platforms

History

It was renamed to its present name on April 1, 1968. The station was transferred to JR East after privatization of the JNR. The station building was renovated in 2012, including installation of Namahage statues. The station building was replaced with a new one 100 meters south in 2018 to support tourism and environmental initiatives.

Passenger statistics
In fiscal year 2019, the station was used by an average of 352 passengers daily (boarding passengers only).

Surrounding area
 Oga City Hall
 Oga Post Office

See also
 List of railway stations in Japan

References

External links

JR East station information page 

Railway stations in Akita Prefecture
Oga Line
Railway stations in Japan opened in 1916
Oga, Akita